Alexander Makarov (born May 19, 1962) is a Russian former professional ice hockey forward. He played parts of two seasons in the Soviet Championship League with Salavat Yulaev Ufa and HC Spartak Moscow.

References

1962 births
HC Spartak Moscow players
Living people
Salavat Yulaev Ufa players
Soviet ice hockey forwards